A quantum field theory of general relativity provides operators that measure the geometry of spacetime. The volume operator  of a region  is defined as the operator that yields the expectation value of a volume measurement of the region , given a state  of quantum General Relativity. Loop Quantum Gravity, for example, provides volume operators, area operators and length operators for regions, surfaces and path respectively.

Sources
Carlo Rovelli and Lee Smolin, "Discreteness of Area and Volume in Quantum Gravity", Nuclear Physics B 442, 593 (1995).
Abhay Ashtekar and Jerzy Lewandowski, Quantum Theory of Geometry II: Volume operators

Quantum field theory
General relativity